The Schubert Club, established in 1882, is a non-profit arts organization in Saint Paul, Minnesota, United States, that promotes the art of music, particularly recital music.

Schubert Club Museum of Musical Instruments

The Club operates the Schubert Club Museum of Musical Instruments which is located in the Landmark Center.  The museum displays a changing selection of instruments, documents and music items from its collections in several gallery displays. 

The collections include:

 Historic keyboard instruments, such as clavichords, harpsichords, organs and pianos
 The Kugler Collection of Musical Instruments, which includes brass instruments, strings, winds, and percussion instruments from around the world, music boxes, early phonographs, and home-made instruments from 20th-century America.
 The Gilman Ordway Manuscript Collection, which includes letters and manuscripts from composers and other important figures in music history.

Other activities
The Club presents eight concert series annually at various venues, runs an annual scholarship competition for music students, provides after-school music lessons, presents master classes, commissions new musical works by American composers, and produces recordings and books. 

The Museum and the administrative offices are located in the historic Landmark Center in downtown Saint Paul, Minnesota.

See also 
 List of music museums

External links

 Schubert Club - official site
 History of the Schubert Club
 Schubert Club Museum
 Music in the Park Series
 Schubert Club in MNopedia, the Minnesota Encyclopedia

Music organizations based in the United States
Arts organizations based in Saint Paul, Minnesota
Culture of Saint Paul, Minnesota
Arts organizations established in the 1880s
1882 establishments in Minnesota